Ralph Hylton Pemberton (17 July 1864 – 11 January 1931) was an English first-class cricketer.

The son of Richard Laurence Pemberton, he was born in July 1864 at Sunderland. He was educated at Eton College, before going up to New College, Oxford. While studying at Oxford, he played first-class cricket for Oxford University in 1885, making three appearances. He scored 65 runs in his three appearances, with a high score of 40. He was later employed as a bursar by Eton College. Pemberton died in January 1931 at Lurgashall, Sussex.

References

External links

1864 births
1931 deaths
Cricketers from Sunderland
People educated at Eton College
Alumni of New College, Oxford
English cricketers
Oxford University cricketers